Nimiyama Chiefdom or Niminyama Chiefdom is a chiefdom in Kono District of Sierra Leone. Its capital is Sewafe.

References 

Chiefdoms of Sierra Leone
Eastern Province, Sierra Leone